Greg Mullane (born 18 September 1953) is an Australian former professional rugby league footballer who played in the 1970s and 1980s. He played in New South Wales Rugby League premiership competition.

Mullane played for Cronulla in 1975 and 1976, then played one season for Canterbury-Bankstown in 1977. 
Mullane returned to Cronulla for the 1979, 1981, 1982 and 1983 seasons. Mullane played for Canterbury-Bankstown in the 1984, 1985 and 1986 seasons.

Greg Mullane is the uncle of rugby league and rugby union footballer Jye Mullane. His father, Mick Mullane Sr. was also a rugby league player from the 1940s and 1950s.

References

1955 births
Living people
Australian rugby league players
Cronulla-Sutherland Sharks players
Canterbury-Bankstown Bulldogs players
Place of birth missing (living people)
Rugby league centres